This is a list of awards and honorary titles received by Joseph Stalin, a Georgian revolutionary and Soviet political leader 
who served as both General Secretary of the Communist Party of the Soviet Union (1922–1952) and Chairman of the Council of Ministers of the Soviet Union (1941–1953).

Awards

USSR

Soviet republics

Foreign

Honorary titles

USSR

Foreign

See also

Awards and decorations received by Kim Jong-il
Awards and decorations received by Kim Il-sung
Awards and decorations received by Leonid Brezhnev
List of awards and honours bestowed upon Fidel Castro
List of awards and honours bestowed upon Muammar Gaddafi
Awards and decorations received by Josip Broz Tito
Orders, decorations, and medals of the Soviet Union

References

Notes

Stalin, Joseph
Joseph Stalin